Dowlatabad (also Romanized as Dowlatābād and jazireh-ye Dowlatābād) is a village in Mazul Rural District, in the Central District of Nishapur County, Razavi Khorasan Province, Iran. At the 2011 census, its population was 415, in 110 families.

References 

Populated places in Firuzeh County